EQCM may refer to:

 Electrochemical QCM, a type of quartz crystal microbalance
 Master chief equipmentman, a type of equipment operator